Pinturas de Tamayo (Pictures of Tamayo) is an orchestral composition in five movements by the American composer Steven Stucky.  The work was commissioned by the Chicago Symphony Orchestra, who premiered the work on March 28, 1996, under the conductor Michael Gielen in Symphony Center, Chicago.  The piece is inspired by the paintings of the Mexican artist Rufino Tamayo.

Composition

Inspiration
Stucky recalled his first encounter with the works of the painter Rufino Tamayo in the score program notes, writing:
He continued:

Structure
The work has a duration of roughly 22 minutes and is composed in five movements named after Tamayo paintings:
Amigas de los pájaros (Friends of the Birds): Vivo
Anochecer (Sunset): Calmo
Mujeres alcanzando la luna (Women Reaching for the Moon): Moderato
Músicas dormidas (Sleeping Musicians): Adagio
La gran galaxia (The Great Galaxy): Tranquillo

Reception
Reviewing the world premiere, John von Rhein of the Chicago Tribune felt that the work did not live up to Tamayo's art and wrote:
Mark Swed of the Los Angeles Times received the piece in a more positive light, however, writing, "Tamayo makes a visual splash, and Stucky responds with a colorful orchestral equivalent."  Richard Whitehouse of Gramophone similarly remarked, "Pinturas de Tamayo (1995) draws on the more tangible imagery of Mexican artist Rufino Tamayo, but the music for the most part is hardly less understated – witness the luminous poise of 'Sunset' or the rapt introspection of 'The Great Galaxy' which makes for an unusually thoughtful apotheosis."

Discography
A recording of Pinturas de Tamayo, performed by Evelyn Glennie and the Singapore Symphony Orchestra under the conductor Lan Shui, was released April 27, 2010 through BIS Records and features Stucky's other orchestral works Spirit Voices and the Concerto for Orchestra No. 2.

References

Compositions by Steven Stucky
1995 compositions
Orchestral suites
Music based on art
Music commissioned by the Chicago Symphony Orchestra